Poland–South Korea relations is the diplomatic relationship between the Republic of Poland and Republic of Korea.

History
Poland and Korea first had official contacts in the early 20th century, when both nations were ruled by foreign powers – Poland was partitioned between Austria, Germany and Russia, while Korea was under Japanese rule. Due to suffering similar oppression, the Koreans and Poles shared strong sympathy, and the March 1st Movement, which aimed to form an independent Korea, made Koreans compared to the Poles of Asia.

As a result of World War II, both Poland and North Korea were occupied by the Soviet Union, which installed communist regimes in both countries. As a result, relations between the Polish People's Republic and Republic of Korea did not exist after the war, when the republics were established and aligned with opposing blocs in the Cold War. Poland supported North Korea against South Korea and virtually no relations between Poland and South Korea existed throughout the Cold War, in which the Democratic People's Republic of Korea was recognized by Polish People's Republic as the legitimate representative of all Korea. It was not until the 1990s when the Cold War ended that Poland and South Korea established relations.

Today

Following the end of Cold War, Poland and South Korea's relations dramatically improved and eventually became a strategic partnership. South Korea was the first Asian country to officially loan $450 million economic aids to Poland. With the relations head higher, Poland and South Korea aimed to increase their good relationship. South Korea deputy minister of Foreign Affairs, Kim Hyung-zhin, praised Poland as one of the best and most influential countries.

Investments from South Korea continues to increase as for the result of the good relationship between two countries. Poland is also a consumer of Korean networking technology and mobile communications technology.

In 2018, Polish President Andrzej Duda expressed his wish to support a United Nations-led initiative over Korea, aiming for peaceful unification between the two-halves of the Korean peninsula.

In 2022, Poland and South Korea strengthened military cooperation with Poland making a major purchase of K2 Black Panther tanks, K9 Thunder howitzers and FA-50 fighter jets from South Korea. The agreement also provides for technology transfer, the launch of production in Poland and joint Korean-Polish development of next-generation military equipment.

Culture
Several Polish museums possess collections of Korean art and artifacts, including the National Museum of Ethnography in Warsaw and District Museum in Toruń.

Resident diplomatic missions 
 Poland has an embassy in Seoul, and an honorary consulate in Daegu.
 South Korea has an embassy in Warsaw, and an honorary consulate in Wrocław.

See also 
Foreign relations of Poland 
Foreign relations of South Korea
Koreans in Poland
North Korea–Poland relations
South Korea–EU relations

References

External links
Embassy of the Republic of Poland in Seoul
Ambasada Republiki Korei w Polsce

 
Korea, South
Poland